Cycle Oregon is a non-profit organization best known for its week-long, non-competitive bike ride, called Classic, held as a fundraiser for the Cycle Oregon Fund. Cycle Oregon additionally hosts GRAVEL, a weekend cycling event, Joyride, a one-day cycling event for women only and WEEKENDER, a weekend cycling event often hosted on a college campus. Cycle Oregon also manages Jumpstart, Oregon's Safe Routes to School program focused on rural communities, and administers the Oregon Scenic Bikeways program.

History
The first Cycle Oregon event took place in September 1988, covering 343 miles between the Oregon cities of Salem and Brookings. More than 1,000 cyclists participated. By 1994, there were more than 2,000 participants participating annually.

Cycle Oregon Classic Routes

Description
Cycle Oregon hosts four non-competitive, recreational cycling events each year to raise money for the Cycle Oregon fund and promote tourism throughout the state. Cycle Oregon events  are supported rides; participants are provided with meals, camping facilities, shower and restroom facilities, and sag wagon support on course. Event locations vary each year with routes announced in January at a kickoff party and through a promotional video. The four events are:

Classic - A week-long bicycling journey showcasing some of Oregon's most spectacular vistas usually held in September

WEEKENDER: A two-day bicycling event most commonly held on a college campus with multiple ride options usually held in July

Joyride is a women-only one-day ride offering short, medium and long routes usually held in June

GRAVEL is a two-day mixed-terrain bicycle event with multiple route options usually held in May

See also
 Hawthorne Bridge bicycle counter

References

External links
Cycle Oregon (official website)

Cycling in Oregon
Non-profit organizations based in Oregon
Bicycle tours
Cycling organizations in the United States
Cycling events in the United States
1991 establishments in Oregon